Panabaker is a surname. Notable people with the surname include:

Danielle Panabaker (born 1987), American film and television actress
Frank Panabaker (1904–1992), Canadian landscape painter
Kay Panabaker (born 1990), American film and television actress, sister of Danielle 
John H. Panabaker (born 1928), Canadian insurance executive